The 2002 AFC Youth Championship qualifying competition is a men's under-19 football competition that determined the eleven teams joining the automatically qualified hosts Qatar in the 2002 AFC Youth Championship final tournament.

A total of 40 AFC member national teams entered the qualifying competition. Players born on or after 1 January 1983 are eligible to participate.

Format 
In each group, teams play each other once at a centralised venue. The eleven group winners qualify for the final tournament.

Teams 

Notes
Teams in bold qualified for the final tournament.

Groups 
The qualifying round was played by 31 July 2002.

Group 1

Group 2

Group 3

Group 4

Group 5

Group 6

Group 7

Group 8

Group 9

Group 10

Group 11

Qualified teams
The following twelve teams qualify for the final tournament. 

1 Bold indicates champions for that year. Italic indicates hosts for that year.

References

AFC U-19 Championship qualification
2002 in Asian football
2002 in youth association football